The Merthyr Tydfil by-election of 13 April 1972 was held after the death of S. O. Davies on 25 February the same year. The Labour Party won the by-election in what had traditionally been a safe seat, although Davies had been elected in the 1970 general election as an Independent after he had been deselected due to his age.

Results

References

Merthyr Tydfil by-election
Merthyr Tydfil by-election
1970s elections in Wales
Merthyr Tydfil by-election
By-elections to the Parliament of the United Kingdom in Welsh constituencies
Politics of Merthyr Tydfil